Senator Hagan may refer to:

United States
Members of the U.S. Senate:
Kay Hagan (1953-2019), senator from North Carolina (2009-2015)

Members of state senates:
George Elliott Hagan (1916-1990), Georgia State Senator (1951-1953)
Bob Hagan (1949-), Ohio Senator from Adams County (1997-2006)

See also
Hagan (surname)